Gino Schiraldi (born March 20, 1958) is a Canadian retired soccer defender who played eleven seasons in the Major Indoor Soccer League and one in the National Professional Soccer League.

In 1980, Schiraldi signed with the Chicago Horizon of the Major Indoor Soccer League.  In 1981, he moved to the Kansas City Comets where he remained until the team folded 1991.  In October 1991, he signed with the Kansas City Attack of the National Professional Soccer League. He retired in 1991, but returned to the Attack in September 1997 as an assistant coach.

References

External links
 Career stats
  Youth Premier Soccer Club - KC Comets
  Youth Soccer  - Facebook

Living people
1958 births
Canadian soccer players
Chicago Horizons players
Kansas City Attack players
Kansas City Comets (original MISL) players
Major Indoor Soccer League (1978–1992) players
National Professional Soccer League (1984–2001) coaches
National Professional Soccer League (1984–2001) players
Association football defenders
Canadian soccer coaches